Surface temperature is the temperature at a surface. 

Specifically, it may refer to:
 Surface air temperature, the temperature of the air near the surface of the earth
 Sea surface temperature, the temperature of water close to the ocean's surface
 Global surface temperature, the combined global average of Surface air temperature and Sea surface temperature 
 Surface temperature of a star, often the effective temperature

See also
 Instrumental temperature record, the historical record of in situ measurements of surface air and sea temperatures
 Pyrometer, a device that remotely determines the temperature of a surface 
 Infrared thermometer, a type of pyrometer